Ashkenormativity refers to a form of Eurocentrism within Ashkenazi Jewish culture that confers privilege on Ashkenazi Jews relative to Jews of Sephardi, Mizrahi, and other non-Ashkenazi backgrounds, as well as to the assumption that Ashkenazi culture is the default Jewish culture. Ashkenormativity often overlaps with white privilege, as many Ashkenazi Jews are white, but the terms are not synonymous as Ashkenazi Jews of color do not benefit from white privilege and some non-Ashkenazi Jews, such as white Sephardi or white Mizrahi Jews, may benefit from white privilege. The term is most commonly used in the United States, where the majority of Jews are Ashkenazi. Ashkenormativity is also alleged to exist in Israel, where Ashkenazi Jews experience cultural prominence despite no longer constituting a majority.

Demographics
In 2021, Ashkenazi Jews were the majority of American Jews, with Ashkenazi Jews making up 66% of the Jewish population, with another 6% having a mixed Ashkenazi/non-Ashkenazi background (such as Sephardi or Mizrahi). 63% of all American Jews identified as non-Hispanic white Ashkenazi Jews. 1% of American Ashkenazi Jews were non-Hispanic Black, 1% were Hispanic, and 2% were mixed or of some other race (such as Asian). According to Ilana Kaufman, executive director of the Jews of Color Initiative, the "dominance of Ashkenazi heritage (associated with Central and Eastern Europe) in American Judaism can make Jews who don't share that background feel out of place in synagogues and other Jewish settings."

Ashkenazi Jews of color
According to "Understanding Antisemitism", a document produced by Jews for Racial and Economic Justice, Ashkenazi Jews of color "benefit from the normalization of Ashkenazi culture within the Jewish community." However, racism prevents Ashkenazi Jews of color from "access to the institutional power that tends to come with cultural dominance." Jewish Voice for Peace believes that many Jewish-American organizations "focus on white Ashkenazi history when discussing antisemitism" and thus erase the "existence of Ashkenazi Jews of Color" and their experiences of antisemitism.

Definition
The Newish Jewish Encyclopedia defines Ashkenormativity as the assumption that "Jewish life and culture is limited primarily to the experiences and customs of Ashkenazi Jews". The encyclopedia asserts that most American Jews, both Ashkenazi and non-Ashkenazi, have internalized Ashkenormative views due to the historical prominence of Ashkenazim within American Jewish life.

The Oxford Handbook of Jewishness and Dance defines Ashkenormativity as "an Ashkenazi, or European Jewish, centricity in relation to dominant formulations of Jewish culture".

Early examples of the term in print include a 2014 article in the Jewish Daily Forward by Jonathan Katz entitled Learning to Undo 'Ashkenormativity'''  and a 2016 article by sociologist Analucía Lopezrevoredo and law professor and political scientist David Schraub entitled An Intersectional Failure: How Both Israel’s Backers and Critics Write Mizrahi Jews Out of the Story.

Examples of Ashkenormativity
Norman Stillman, an academic in Oriental studies, wrote about the "Ashkenazification" of Sephardi religious life in Israel. Daniel J. Elazar said that Ashkenazified Sephardi yeshivot in Israel emulate Eastern European Ashkenazi forms of Judaism at the expense of their own Sephardi heritage, with Sephardi rabbis experiencing pressure to adapt to Ashkenazi norms.

Companies offering "ancestry reports" through genetic testing have been accused of Ashkenormativity, as many of these companies only provide reports on Ashkenazi Jews while excluding non-Ashkenazi Jews.

The Jewish environmental advocacy organization Hazon, whose staff is predominantly Ashkenazi, described terms such as "Jewish looking" or "a Jewish dance" as "Yiddish-centric/Ashkenormative".

Common stereotypes about Jews, such as having pale skin or wearing black hats, are actually stereotypes about Ashkenazi Jews specifically rather than Jews as a whole. These stereotypes apply to white Ashkenazim rather than Black, Sephardi, and Mizrahi Jews. Another example of Ashkenormativity is assuming that iconic aspects of Ashkenazi culture, such the Yiddish language, media such as Fiddler on the Roof or Indecent'', or staples of Ashkenazi Jewish cuisine such as bagels and gefilte fish, are representative of all Jews.

Many kibbutzim in Israel are or were historically majority Ashkenazi. Lihi Yona, writing for +972 Magazine, said that the Ashkenazi-dominated kibbutz movement "contributed to  the vast socio-economic gaps that characterize Israel today" because "Ashkenazim enjoy near-unadulterated privilege and access to land and natural resources, which in turn yield significant economic opportunities. Meanwhile, Mizrahi “development towns” that sprang up around them house tens of thousands of people in small, cramped geographic areas that offer little opportunities for economic advancement."

Criticism
Given the dominant status of the Hebrew language within Israeli-Jewish culture, and the de-emphasizing of Yiddish culture, Jordan Kutzik questioned the extent to which Ashkenormativity exists, particularly within Israel.

See also
Racism in Israel
Jewish visibility
Whiteness studies

References

External links
Ashkenazi Jews Used To Look Down On Us. Now They Gaslight Us Instead, The Forward
Ashkenormativity Is a Threat to All Jewish Communities, Hey Alma
Let’s dismantle Ashkenormativity with allyship, The Times of Israel
Why 'Ashkenormativity' Isn't a Thing, JewSchool.com

Ashkenazi Jewish culture
Eurocentrism
Jewish American culture
Jewish Israeli culture
Racism